Christopher Vogler (born 1949) is a Hollywood development executive, screenwriter, author and educator, best known for working with Disney and his screenwriting guide, The Writer's Journey: Mythic Structure For Writers, from 2007.

Early life and education
Born in Missouri, Vogler studied filmmaking at the USC School of Cinema-Television, the alma mater of George Lucas.

Career
Vogler has worked for Disney studios, Fox 2000 pictures, and Warner Bros. in the development department. He contributed story material to the Disney animated feature The Lion King.

He has also taught in the USC School of Cinema-Television, Division of Animation and Digital Arts as well as at UCLA extension.  He is President of the company Storytech Literary Consulting. It was founded in 1999 and its Vice President, Brad Schreiber, consults on scripts and books, using Vogler's approach.

Campbell and Writer's Journey
Vogler, like Lucas, was inspired by the writings of mythologist Joseph Campbell, particularly The Hero with a Thousand Faces, which detailed the Hero's Journey archetype in classical mythology.
Vogler used Campbell's work to create a 7-page company memo for Hollywood screenwriters, A Practical Guide to The Hero with a Thousand Faces, which Vogler later developed into The Writer's Journey: Mythic Structure for Storytellers and Screenwriters in 1992, and then The Writer's Journey: Mythic Structure For Writers. Vogler has since spun off his techniques into worldwide masterclasses.

References

External links 

American film studio executives
Living people
USC School of Cinematic Arts alumni
1949 births
American male screenwriters
Screenwriting instructors
American male non-fiction writers
Warner Bros. people
Writers of books about writing fiction